Troy Kingi (born 1984) is a New Zealand musician and actor from Northland, first receiving media attention when he appeared in the 2013 film Mt. Zion. Kingi is a multi-instrumentalist, is known for his 10/10/10 project: the plan to release 10 albums in 10 genres across 10 years.

Biography

Troy Kingi was born in 1984 in Rotorua, and was raised in Rotorua, Te Kaha and Kerikeri. Kingi is of Te Arawa, Ngāpuhi and Te Whānau-ā-Apanui descent. He began learning guitar at Te Aute College in Hawke's Bay, and formed his first band, Toll House, at Kerikeri High School. Toll House entered the Smokefreerockquest, winning the regional Northland competition.

Since the early 2000s, Kingi has lived in Kerikeri. He studied at the Music and Audio Institute of New Zealand in Auckland, and on returning to Kerikeri fronted a number of short-lived bands, including Mongolian Deathworm, Kingkachoo, Troy Kingi and the Tigers, Full Moon Street and Typhoon Fools, while also working as a scuba instructor and fruit picking in Kerikeri orchards. Kingi's work with Typhoon Fools gained him more widespread attention, and led to him being cast in the film Mt. Zion (2013). Kingi also featured on the film's soundtrack, and after the film's release, toured New Zealand with the film's lead actor Stan Walker. Kingi released his first extended play in 2013. His appearance in Mt. Zion led to further work as an actor, including The Pā Boys (2014) and Hunt for the Wilderpeople (2016). Kingi collaborated on the Stan Walker song "Aotearoa" (2014), a song created part of a Te Wiki o te Reo Māori project for a song sung in Māori language to reach number one in New Zealand, something that had not been seen since Pātea Māori Club's "Poi E" in 1984.

Kingi set himself the goal of releasing 10 albums in he span of 10 years, performing in 10 different genres. The first in this series was Guitar Party at Uncle's Bach (2016), a double album recorded live in seven days at Lyttelton, New Zealand. At the Waiata Māori Music Awards, Kingi won the awards for best Māori pop artist and best solo male artist. His second album, the soul-psychedelic Shake That Skinny Ass All the Way to Zygertron (2017), featured "Aztechknowledgey", which was nominated for the APRA Silver Scroll award. Holy Colony Burning Acres (2019) was a political roots reggae album featuring songs that discussed subjects including West Papua, the Inuit, Hawaiʻi and  Aboriginal Tasmanians, The album won the Taite Music Prize in 2020.

In 2020, Kingi released The Ghost of Freddie Cesar, an album inspired by a cassette tape Kingi found in the belongings of his father, who disappeared in 2005. The cassette tape since went missing, and the album was a re-creation of what Kingi remembered of the tape, blended with his own interpretations and original content. The album was a commercial success, reaching number two on the New Zealand albums chart. Kingi's 2021 album, Black Sea Golden Ladder, was written in four days at an apartment on Clyde Wharf in Wellington Harbour, as a part of the Matairangi Mahi Toi Artist Residency programme. The album was co-produced with New Zealand singer-songwriter Delaney Davidson.

Kingi plans to retire as a musician after releasing 10 albums, to become a music producer and a gardener at land he owns in Ōkaihau.

Personal life 

Kingi's father disappeared around Christmas 2005, while driving between Rotorua and Auckland. Kingi has five children with his wife Huia, and works with the Raid Movement, a group combatting youth suicide in Northland.

Discography

Studio albums

Reissues

Extended plays

Singles

As lead artist

As featured artist

Promotional singles

Other charted songs

Guest appearances

Filmography

Film

Television

Notes

References

1984 births
21st-century New Zealand male singers
21st-century multi-instrumentalists
Living people
Māori-language singers
New Zealand male singer-songwriters
New Zealand record producers
People educated at Te Aute College
People from Kerikeri
People from Rotorua
Ngāpuhi people
Te Arawa people
Te Whānau-ā-Apanui people